Reimer Stadium was a sport stadium in Hillsboro, Kansas, United States.  The facility is primarily used by the Tabor College football and track & field teams.  The stadium was also used for Hillsboro USD 410 sporting events and other community events.  The stadium was named for former athletic director Del Reimer.

In 2008, Reimer Stadium was torn down and replaced by Joel Wiens stadium in 2009.

References

External links
 Tabor College - official website

College football venues
Defunct sports venues in Kansas
Buildings and structures in Marion County, Kansas
Sports venues demolished in 2008